"Rankin, Ontario" re-directs here. For the community in Renfrew County, see Rankin, Renfrew County, Ontario

Papineau-Cameron is a township municipality in northeastern Ontario, Canada, in Nipissing District. The township is located on the south side of the Mattawa and Ottawa Rivers along Highway 17.

In 2007, Papineau-Cameron, along with the town of Mattawa and the townships of Bonfield, Mattawan and Calvin cooperated to create a newly branded Mattawa Voyageur Country tourist region in order to promote the area.

Communities
The township includes the communities of Klock, Morel, and Rankin.

Demographics 

See also
List of townships in Ontario
List of francophone communities in Ontario

References

External links 

Municipalities in Nipissing District
Single-tier municipalities in Ontario
Township municipalities in Ontario